Baiano may refer to:

People

Arts and entertainment
Novos Baianos, Brazilian rock band in the 1960s and 70s
Enrico Baiano (born 1960), Italian harpsichordist
Lucas Baiano (born 1988), Canadian filmmaker

Sports

Football
Gil Baiano (born 1966), born José Gildásio Pereira de Matos, Brazilian rightback
Edinho Baiano (born 1967), born Édson Manoel do Nascimento, Brazilian defender
Francesco Baiano (born 1968), Italian footballer 
Júnior Baiano (born 1970), born Raimundo Ferreira Ramos Jr., Brazilian centre-back
Fábio Baiano (born 1975), born Fábio da Silva Morais, Brazilian attacking midfielder
Baiano (footballer born 1978), born Dermival Almeida Lima, Brazilian rightback
Serginho Baiano (born 1978), born Elisérgio da Silva, Brazilian winger
Fernando Baiano (born 1979), born João Fernando Nelo, Brazilian striker
Ricardo Baiano (born 1980), born Ricardo Santos Lago, Bosnian midfielder
Chiquinho Baiano (born 1980), born Francisco Andrade Gomes Junior, Brazilian leftback
Val Baiano (born 1981), born Osvaldo Félix Souza, Brazilian forward
Baiano (footballer, born 1981), born Erison Da Silva Santos Carnietto, Brazilian midfielder
Neto Baiano (born 1982), born Euvaldo José de Aguiar Neto, Brazilian forward
Rafael Baiano (born 1983), born 	Rafael Alexandrino dos Santos, Brazilian forward
Éder Baiano (born 1984), born Eder Luís de Carvalho, Brazilian defender
Baiano (footballer born 1987), born Wanderson Souza Carneiro, Brazilian rightback
Dija Baiano (born 1990), born Djavan de Lima Araujo, Brazilian forward
Baiano (footballer, born 1992), born Fabrício Santos de Jesus, Brazilian defensive midfielder
Jefferson Baiano (born 1995), born Jefferson Silva dos Santos, Brazilian forward

Basketball
Baiano (basketball) (1912–1956), born Aluízio Freire Ramos Accioly Neto, Brazilian basketball player

Other uses
 Baiano, Campania, a comune in the Province of Avellino, Italy
Demonym of Bahia state, Brazil
Campeonato Baiano, a Brazilian football league